The Del Monte Super Cup 2022 was the 27th edition of the event and the pre-season volleyball tournament of The SuperLega Credem Banca 2022–23. It was played from 31 October to 1 November 2022.

After eleven years, the tournament returned to Sardinia. The edition of Super Cup is organized by SuperLega, together with  the FIPAV Sardinia Regional Committee, the Sardinia Region and the Municipality of Cagliari.

Rai Sprots and Volleyball World TV are TV partners to this tournament.

Sir Safety Conad Perugia won their 4th title beating Cucine Lube Civitanova in  intensive final with score 3–2. Oleh Plotnytskyi was named as the MVP.

Format
Four teams participate in single-elimination tournament.

Venues

Teams
Top four teams from the last season are qualified to this tournament. It's the eleven times that these four teams qualified to final four together in Super Cup history.
 Cucine Lube Civitanova
 Sir Safety Conad Perugia
 Itas Trentino
 Valsa Group Modena

Final Four program
 All times are local, CET (UTC+01:00).

Semifinals

|}

3rd place match

|}

Final

|}

Final standings

See also
2022–23 SuperLega
2022–23 Italian Cup

References

External links
 Official Page(in Italian)
Official doucument 2022(in Italian)

Men's volleyball competitions in Italy
Super Cup
Super Cup
Italy